"Finding My Way Back" is a song by Jaheim. It was released on January 22, 2010 and is the second single from his album, Another Round. It was produced by Ivan "Orthodox" Barias and Carvin "Ransum" Haggins. It reached No. 12 on the Billboard Hot R&B/Hip-Hop Songs chart and No. 95 on the Billboard Hot 100.

Charts

Weekly charts

Year-end charts

References

2009 songs
2010 singles
Jaheim songs
Songs written by Ivan Barias
Songs written by Carvin Haggins
Songs written by Miguel (singer)
Song recordings produced by Carvin & Ivan
Atlantic Records singles